Down Home Blues may refer to:
"Down Home Blues", song sung by Ethel Waters on Black Swan Records in 1921
"Down Home Blues". a song by George Jackson
Down Home Blues (Brownie McGhee and Sonny Terry album), 1960
Down Home Blues (Lightnin' Hopkins album), 1965